The Elwood Adams Store was an historic hardware store at 156 Main Street in Worcester, Massachusetts. At the time of its closing in October 2017, it had been the longest operating hardware store in the United States, having begun business in 1782.  The building that the store resided in was built about 1831, and is one of Worcester's oldest commercial buildings.  It was listed on the National Register of Historic Places in 1980.

Description and history
The Elwood Adams Store building is located on the west side of Main Street in the northern part of Worcester's downtown area.  It is a four-story masonry structure, its facade crowned by an Italianate wooden cornice.  The ground floor consists of two storefronts separate by a brick pier, although these have for many years functioned as a single establishment.  Windows are set in rectangular openings with stone sills and lintels.

The hardware store that became the Elwood Adams Store was established in 1782 by Daniel Waldo Sr. on this site, erecting the city's first brick building.  Waldo's son Daniel Jr. took over the business in 1791, and later partnered with Henry Miller, who purchased it in partnership with George Rice in 1821.  Miller took full ownership of the business in 1831, and purchased the building from Waldo's heirs in 1865.  Around that time, it was raised from its original 2-1/2 stories to four stories, and its front facade was refaced with new brick.  Miller sold the business to Elwood Adams and a partner in 1886.  First known as Smith & Adams, it became known as the Elwood Adams Store in 1891, the name it retained until its closing in 2017.

See also
Armsby Block, next door
National Register of Historic Places listings in northwestern Worcester, Massachusetts
National Register of Historic Places listings in Worcester County, Massachusetts

References

Commercial buildings on the National Register of Historic Places in Massachusetts
Buildings and structures in Worcester, Massachusetts
Retail buildings in Massachusetts
Hardware stores of the United States
National Register of Historic Places in Worcester, Massachusetts
1831 establishments in Massachusetts
Commercial buildings completed in 1831